Nikolay Valerianovich Muraviev or Muravyov (1850–1908) (anglicized Nicholas V. Muravev) was an Imperial Russian politician, nephew of the famed Count Nikolay Muravyov-Amursky, explorer and Governor General of the Russian Far East.

Muraviev was a graduate of both the University of Saint Petersburg and the University of Moscow. Early in his career he was a noted lecturer on criminal law at the University of Moscow and served in various positions within the judiciary. He came to prominence after successfully prosecuting the assassins of Emperor Alexander II.

In 1892 he was appointed Imperial Secretary. He served as Minister of Justice from 1894 to early 1905. He was appointed Ambassador to Italy in 1905 and served until his death in 1908.

He was married to Katharina Vasilyevna Slepzowa (1862-1929), who secondly married the German industrialist Prince Guido Henckel von Donnersmarck.
(Source: Materialy dlya Istorii Dvoryanskikh Rodov Martynovykh i Sleptsovykh, by A. N. Nartsov. Tambov, 1904)

References

Out of My Past: The Memoirs of Count Kokovtsov Edited by H.H. Fisher and translated by Laura Matveev; Stanford University Press, 1935.
The Memoirs of Count Witte Edited and translated by Sydney Harcave; Sharpe Press, 1990.

1850 births
1918 deaths
Ambassadors of the Russian Empire to Italy
Russian monarchists
Justice ministers of Russia
Members of the State Council (Russian Empire)